Carcross Airport  is adjacent to Carcross, Yukon, Canada on the shore of Grayling Bay on Tagish Lake.

See also
Carcross Water Aerodrome

References

External links
Page about this airport on COPA's Places to Fly airport directory

Registered aerodromes in Yukon